Francisca Koki Manunga (born 30 October 1993) is a female hurdler from Kenya. She competed in the Women's 400 metres hurdles event at the 2015 World Championships in Athletics in Beijing, China. She was disqualified after failing a doping test.

References

External links

Kenyan female hurdlers
Living people
Place of birth missing (living people)
1993 births
World Athletics Championships athletes for Kenya
Doping cases in athletics
Kenyan sportspeople in doping cases
Athletes (track and field) at the 2014 Commonwealth Games
Commonwealth Games competitors for Kenya